Castleruddery Stone Circle is a recumbent stone circle and National Monument located in County Wicklow, Ireland.

Location

History

The stone circle was built c. 2500 BC.

Description

It is composed of 29 stones, some of which are decorated with cup marks. The circle has two enormous white quartz portal stones at the entrance, each weighing at least 15 tons. The  metre wide bank has an opening in the east.

References

National Monuments in County Wicklow